Kogia is a genus of toothed whales within the superfamily Physeteroidea comprising two extant and two extinct species from the Neogene

Pygmy sperm whale, Kogia breviceps
Dwarf sperm whale, Kogia sima
†Kogia pusilla,  Italy, Middle Pliocene
†Kogia danomurai Pisco Formation, Peru, latest Miocene

References

 
Cetacean genera
Taxa named by George Robert Gray